George Vose (4 October 1912 – 20 June 1981) was an English footballer and coach who played as a halfback. He played for Manchester United in the Football League, also representing Stalybridge Celtic, Altrincham and Runcorn.

References

1911 births
1981 deaths
English footballers
Manchester United F.C. players
Association football defenders